John C Treadwell (May 19, 1941 – December 14, 2014) was an American football player who played at the offensive guard and linebacker positions for the University of Texas from 1960–1962.   He was a consensus first-team All-American in 1961, and was also named an Academic All-American in 1962 and 1963.  The Houston Post named him the Most Valuable Player on defense in the Southwest Conference for 1962, and he played in the 1963 Hula Bowl. He died on December 14, 2014, while affected by chronic traumatic encephalopathy.

See also
 1962 College Football All-America Team

References

External links
 Johnny Treadwell profile
 Texas Longhorns (Sports Publishing LLC, 2005), by Whit Canning, pp. 166–170

1941 births
2014 deaths
All-American college football players
Texas Longhorns football players